The 1968–69 international cricket season was from September 1968 to April 1969.

Season overview

December

West Indies in Australia

January

MCC in Sri Lanka

February

England in Pakistan

West Indies in New Zealand

March

Ceylon in India

References

International cricket competitions by season
1968 in cricket
1969 in cricket